Bridgeboro may refer to:

Bridgeboro, Georgia, an unincorporated community
Bridgeboro, New Jersey, an unincorporated community
Bridgeboro Limestone, a geologic formation